This is a list of the active vessels of the Royal Danish Navy.

Overview

1st Squadron

Division 11
 Thetis-class ocean patrol vessels:
HDMS Thetis (F357)
HDMS Triton (F358)
HDMS Vædderen(F359)
HDMS Hvidbjørnen(F360)

Division 19

 Knud Rasmussen-class ocean patrol craft:
 HDMS Knud Rasmussen (P570)
 HDMS Ejnar Mikkelsen (P571)
 HDMS Lauge Koch (P572)

Royal Yacht
 Royal Yacht (no class given):
 HDMY Dannebrog (A540)

Cartography
 Holm class multirole boats:
 HDMS Birkholm (A541)
 HDMS Fyrholm (A542)
Cartography vessels of the SKA-class:
 HDMS SKA-12
 HDMS SKA-16
 Cartography vessels of the O-class:
 HDMS O-1
 HDMS O-2

2nd Squadron

Division 21
 3 Iver Huitfeldt-class frigates:
 HDMS Iver Huitfeldt (F361) 
 HDMS Peter Willemoes (F362) 
 HDMS Niels Juel (F363)

Division 22

  frigates:
 HDMS Absalon (F341)
 HDMS Esbern Snare (F342)

MCM Denmark 
MCM Denmark is a container based mine countermeasures concept, which can be deployed on Absalon-, Thetis-,  Sea Supply-, Knud Rasmussen- class, HDMS Sleipner, chartered ships with container positions or ordinary trucks.
 Holm class multirole boats (fitted for remote controlled mine sweeping):
 HDMS Hirsholm (MSD5)
 HDMS Saltholm (MSD6)
 MSF-class drone minehunters
 HDMS MSF1
 HDMS MSF2
 HDMS MSF3
 HDMS MSF4
 MRD-class drone minehunters
 HDMS MRD1 (Laid up at the Danish Navy's depot at Jerup)
 HDMS MRD2 (Laid up at the Danish Navy's depot at Jerup)
 HDMS MRD3 (Laid up at Naval Base Frederikshavn)
 HDMS MRD4 (In service as a tender at Naval Base Korsør)
 HDMS MRD5 (Laid up at the Danish Navy's depot at Jerup)
 HDMS MRD6 (Laid up at the Danish Navy's depot at Jerup)

Diving Service 
Flyvefisken-class patrol vessels: 
Y311 Søløven

3rd Squadron

Division 31

 Diana-class patrol vessels:
 HDMS Diana (P520)
 HDMS Freja (P521)
 HDMS Havfruen (P522)
 HDMS Najaden (P523)
 HDMS Nymfen (P524)
 HDMS Rota (P525)

Division 32

 Sea Supply-class environmental protection vessels,
 HDMS Gunnar Thorson (A560)
 HDMS Gunnar Seidenfaden (A561)
 Sea Truck-class environmental protection vessels
 HDMS Mette Miljø (A562)
 HDMS Marie Miljø (A563)
 Miljø-class environmental protection vessels
 HDMS Miljø 101 (Y340)
 HDMS Miljø 102 (Y341)
 HDMS Miljø 103 (Y342)
 Transport-vessels (no class given):
 HDMS Sleipner (A559)

Division 33
 Svanen-class sail training ships
 HDMS Svanen (Y101)
 HDMS Thyra (Y102)
 Holm class multirole boats vessels:
 HDMS Ertholm (A543)
 HDMS Alholm (A544)

Vessels not organised in the squadrons

 Storebro SB90E:
 4 LCP, Landing Craft Personnel; 10 troops, 4 stretchers or 2 tonnes of cargo for the Absalon-class
 2 SAR, Search and Rescue vessels for the Knud Rasmussen-class
 VTS-class fast response vessels:
 HDMS VTS-1
 HDMS VTS-4
 MHV90 class patrol boats
 HDMS Lunden (Y343)
 Arvak class station tenders
 HDMS Arvak (Y344),
 HDMS Alsin (Y345)

Plus a variety of RHIBs, smaller vessels as well as several Ro/Ro-vessels on a permanent charter.

Naval Home Guard
Though not a part of the Royal Danish Navy, Naval Home Guard vessels support the Danish Navy in a number of tasks.

 MHV800 class patrol boats
 Aldebaran (MHV801)
 Carina (MHV802)
 Aries (MHV803)
 Andromeda (MHV804)
 Gemini (MHV805)
 Dubhe (MHV806)
 Jupiter (MHV807)
 Lyra (MHV808)
 Antares (MHV809)
 Luna (MHV810)
 Apollo (MHV811)
 Hercules (MHV812)
 Baunen (MHV813)
 Budstikken (MHV814)
 Kureren (MHV815)
 Patrioten (MHV816)
 Partisan (MHV817)
 Sabotøren (MHV851) (ex-MHV818, hull extended to the size of MHV900 class and the pennantnumber changed to reflect this)
 MHV900 class patrol boats,
 Enø (MHV901)
 Manø (MHV902)
 Hjortø (MHV903)
 Lyø (MHV904)
 Askø (MHV905)
 Fænø (MHV906)
 Hvidsteen (MHV907)
 Brigaden (MHV908)
 Speditøren (MHV909)
 Ringen (MHV910)
 Bopa (MHV911)
 Holger Danske (MHV912)

Notable historical vessels 
 List of ships of the Dano-Norwegian Navy
 HDMS Peder Skram (F352)
 HDMS Olfert Fischer (F355)
 HDMS Sælen (S323)
 HDMS Niels Juel (1918)
 HDMS Jylland

See also
 Dano-Norwegian Navy

References

 
Naval
Denmark